Limonium platyphyllum, the broad-leaved statice, or florist's sea lavender, is a species of flowering plant in the family Plumbaginaceae. It is native to the Black Sea region; Bulgaria, Romania, Ukraine, Crimea, south and east European Russia, and the Caucasus, and it has been introduced to Great Britain. There are a number of cultivars, including the well-known 'Violetta' which has darker petals.

References

platyphyllum
Halophytes
Garden plants
Flora of Bulgaria
Flora of Romania
Flora of Ukraine
Flora of the Crimean Peninsula
Flora of South European Russia
Flora of East European Russia
Flora of the Caucasus
Plants described in 1964